Adscita mannii is a moth of the family Zygaenidae. It is found in Germany, France, Switzerland, Austria, Italy, Spain, Slovenia and the Balkan Peninsula. The range extends to north-western Turkey.

The larvae possibly feed on Helianthemum species and Fabaceae species, including Onobrychis.

Subspecies
Adscita mannii mannii
Adscita mannii atlantica Alberti, 1937

References

External links

Adscita mannii images at  Consortium for the Barcode of Life

Procridinae
Moths described in 1853
Moths of Europe
Moths of Asia